The arrondissement of Sarrebourg-Château-Salins is an arrondissement of France in the Moselle department in the Grand Est region. It has 230 communes.

Composition

The communes of the arrondissement of Sarrebourg-Château-Salins are:

Aboncourt-sur-Seille
Abreschviller
Achain
Ajoncourt
Alaincourt-la-Côte
Albestroff
Amelécourt
Arzviller
Aspach
Assenoncourt
Attilloncourt
Aulnois-sur-Seille
Avricourt
Azoudange
Bacourt
Barchain
Bassing
Baudrecourt
Bébing
Bellange
Belles-Forêts
Bénestroff
Berling
Bermering
Berthelming
Bettborn
Bezange-la-Petite
Bickenholtz
Bidestroff
Bioncourt
Blanche-Église
Bourdonnay
Bourgaltroff
Bourscheid
Bréhain
Brouderdorff
Brouviller
Buhl-Lorraine
Burlioncourt
Chambrey
Château-Bréhain
Château-Salins
Château-Voué
Chenois
Chicourt
Conthil
Craincourt
Cutting
Dabo
Dalhain
Danne-et-Quatre-Vents
Dannelbourg
Delme
Desseling
Diane-Capelle
Dieuze
Dolving
Domnom-lès-Dieuze
Donjeux
Donnelay
Fénétrange
Fleisheim
Fonteny
Fossieux
Foulcrey
Francaltroff
Fraquelfing
Frémery
Fresnes-en-Saulnois
Fribourg
Garrebourg
Gelucourt
Gerbécourt
Givrycourt
Gondrexange
Gosselming
Grémecey
Guébestroff
Guéblange-lès-Dieuze
Guébling
Guermange
Guinzeling
Guntzviller
Haboudange
Hampont
Hangviller
Hannocourt
Haraucourt-sur-Seille
Harreberg
Hartzviller
Haselbourg
Hattigny
Haut-Clocher
Hellering-lès-Fénétrange
Héming
Henridorff
Hérange
Hermelange
Hertzing
Hesse
Hilbesheim
Hommarting
Hommert
Honskirch
Hultehouse
Ibigny
Imling
Insming
Insviller
Jallaucourt
Juvelize
Juville
Kerprich-aux-Bois
Lafrimbolle
Lagarde
Landange
Laneuveville-en-Saulnois
Laneuveville-lès-Lorquin
Langatte
Languimberg
Lemoncourt
Léning
Lesse
Ley
Lezey
Lhor
Lidrezing
Lindre-Basse
Lindre-Haute
Liocourt
Lixheim
Lorquin
Lostroff
Loudrefing
Lubécourt
Lucy
Lutzelbourg
Maizières-lès-Vic
Malaucourt-sur-Seille
Manhoué
Marimont-lès-Bénestroff
Marsal
Marthille
Métairies-Saint-Quirin
Metting
Mittelbronn
Mittersheim
Molring
Moncourt
Montdidier
Morville-lès-Vic
Morville-sur-Nied
Moussey
Moyenvic
Mulcey
Munster
Nébing
Neufmoulins
Neufvillage
Niderhoff
Niderviller
Niederstinzel
Nitting
Oberstinzel
Obreck
Ommeray
Oriocourt
Oron
Pettoncourt
Pévange
Phalsbourg
Plaine-de-Walsch
Postroff
Prévocourt
Puttigny
Puzieux
Réchicourt-le-Château
Réding
Réning
Rhodes
Riche
Richeval
Rodalbe
Romelfing
Rorbach-lès-Dieuze
Saint-Epvre
Saint-Georges
Saint-Jean-de-Bassel
Saint-Jean-Kourtzerode
Saint-Louis
Saint-Médard
Saint-Quirin
Salonnes
Sarraltroff
Sarrebourg
Schalbach
Schneckenbusch
Sotzeling
Tarquimpol
Tincry
Torcheville
Troisfontaines
Turquestein-Blancrupt
Vahl-lès-Bénestroff
Val-de-Bride
Vannecourt
Vasperviller
Vaxy
Veckersviller
Vergaville
Vescheim
Vibersviller
Vic-sur-Seille
Vieux-Lixheim
Villers-sur-Nied
Vilsberg
Virming
Vittersbourg
Viviers
Voyer
Walscheid
Waltembourg
Wintersbourg
Wuisse
Xanrey
Xocourt
Xouaxange
Zarbeling
Zilling
Zommange

History

The arrondissement of Sarrebourg-Château-Salins was created in January 2016 by the merger of the former arrondissements of Sarrebourg and Château-Salins.

References

Sarrebourg-Chateau-Salins
States and territories established in 2016